Speedball 2: Brutal Deluxe is a 1990 video game based on a violent futuristic cyberpunk sport that draws on elements of handball and ice hockey, and rewards violent play as well as goals. The concept of the game is very reminiscent of the 1975 film Rollerball. The original game was developed by Bitmap Brothers, with various remakes for many platforms since being published. It is a sequel to the 1988 game Speedball.

The game was released for multiple platforms: the Acorn Archimedes, Atari Jaguar, Atari ST, Amiga, Amiga CD32, PC, Commodore 64, Sega Mega Drive, Sega Master System, Game Boy and Game Boy Advance. The first version was simultaneously developed and released for the Amiga and the Atari ST in 1990.

Plot
According to the game's story, the first Speedball league (founded in 2095) fails due to violence and corruption. As the organisation gives rise to anarchy, the game is forced underground. But five years later, in an attempt to regain public interest, Speedball 2 is born. The game starts in 2105 with the emergence of a new team, Brutal Deluxe.

Gameplay

Speedball 2 makes several changes over the original Speedball. Teams have nine players on court rather than five, and targets on the floor and walls can be hit to receive bonus points. The number of points that a team receives for scoring a goal starts at 10 but can be increased to 15 or 20 via the use of score multipliers located on the walls of the pitch. The same number of points for scoring a goal is given for injuring a player from the opposing team. When a player is injured, he is replaced by one of three substitutes. If all three substitutes are injured, the injured player will be forced to return to the game and play on in spite of his injuries. There are five game modes: knockout, cup, league, practice and multiplayer. Each game lasts for 180 seconds.

Reception

Speedball 2 is one of Bitmap Brothers' most successful titles. Zzap, CU Amiga and Computer and Video Games scored the game highly. The music, written by Simon Rogers and remixed and coded by Richard Joseph, won the 1991 Golden Joystick Award for Best Soundtrack. The voices, including the 'Ice Cream' salesman, were voiced by sometime Richard Joseph collaborator Michael Burdett working under the pseudonym Jams O'Donnell. The game was voted the 3rd best game of all time in Amiga Power.

In 1994, PC Gamer US named Speedball 2 the 24th best computer game ever. The editors wrote, "You just can't beat this game for pure action." That same year, PC Gamer UK named it the 30th best computer game of all time, calling it "totally convincing and very stylish".

In 1998, PC Gamer declared it the 40th-best computer game ever released, and the editors called it "still one of the funnest sports games out there".

Speedball 2 has sold over two million copies.

Remakes 
Various remakes of Speedball 2 have been released.

Speedball 2100 

Speedball 2100, released only for the PlayStation, is a 3D version of Speedball 2 with more options such as choosing and renaming any team, instead of having to play with Brutal Deluxe. This version, released in September 2000, failed to win over gamers and press because it lacked the speed and gameplay of the originals.
Speedball 2100 will be released on Evercade as part of the Bitmap Brothers Collection 1.

Speedball 2: Brutal Deluxe (2007)

Empire Interactive released Speedball 2: Brutal Deluxe onto Xbox Live Arcade on October 17, 2007.  The game features a 3D graphics mode in addition to the "classic" visuals, as well as additional teams and online play.  According to statements by the Bitmap Brothers, this version of the game takes place in the 24th century.
It was eventually delisted from Xbox Live Arcade, but people who have already downloaded it are still able to play it.

Speedball 2 Tournament

Frogster Interactive Pictures released a remake developed by Kylotonn, Speedball 2 Tournament onto Steam in November 2007.

Speedball 2: Evolution
In February 2011, Tower Studios released another updated version called Speedball 2: Evolution, developed by Vivid Games for iOS and MacOS. The game features multiplayer support and achievements via Game Center. It was also released for the PlayStation Portable and PlayStation 3.

Speedball 2 HD
A remake for the PC titled Speedball 2 HD was released December 5, 2013, on Steam. It was developed by Vivid Games and directed by Jon Hare.

References

External links
Bitmap Brothers pages on Speedball 2: Brutal Deluxe, 2100 and Arena
Speedball II review, 1992

1990 video games
Acorn Archimedes games
Amiga games
Atari ST games
Amiga CD32 games
Commodore 64 games
Cyberpunk video games
Fantasy sports video games
Game Boy games
Master System games
Sega Genesis games
Video games scored by Barry Leitch
Video games scored by David Whittaker
Video games scored by Richard Joseph
Video games set in the 22nd century
Video games developed in the United Kingdom
Akella games
Multiplayer and single-player video games
Empire Interactive games
The Bitmap Brothers games
Image Works games